Khelo India: National Programme for Development of Sports, branded as Khelo India, aims at improving India's sports culture at the grass-root level through organized talent identification, structured sporting competitions and infrastructure development. It is a Government of India programme launched in 2017-18 under the tenure Prime Minister Narendra Modi and Sports Minister's Vijay Goel and Rajyavardhan Singh Rathore.

Competitions 

 Khelo India Youth Games
 Editions: 2018, 2019, 2020, 2021
 Khelo India University Games
 Editions: 2020, 2022 
 Khelo India Winter Games
 Editions: 2020

Khelo India Centres of Excellence 
Khelo India State Centres of Excellence (KISCE) are sports facilities across India, built upon existing facilities, aiming to provide basic facilities for sportspersons with potential. Each centre will cater to three sporting disciplines.

See also 
 Sports in India

References

Further reading 
 

 
2016 establishments in India
Government schemes in India